Tower Centre in Calgary, Alberta, Canada, is an office tower and retail centre connected to the Calgary Tower. It is only three minutes on foot from the CTrain's 1 Street Southwest station and Centre Street station.

Former Railway Services

Below the office tower and retail centre are the remains of a disused inter-city railway station formerly used by Canadian Pacific Railway, Via Rail, Rocky Mountaineer and Royal Canadian Pacific passenger train services. The station is located on the Canadian Pacific Railway line.

The station was completed in 1967 to serve the Canadian Pacific Railway. Following Via Rail's takeover of Canadian Pacific's passenger services, it was managed by Via Rail until the company's 1990 service reductions ended regular rail services to Calgary.  Afterwards, both Rocky Mountaineer and Royal Canadian Pacific used the station intermittently for several years as a boarding point for their rail tours.

References

External links
 All Aboard! When Calgary had whistle stops and other rail rarities (CBC News)
 Old Canadian Train Stations, Western Canada, Manitoba, Saskatchewan and Alberta
 VIA Rail Station under Calgary Tower (Imgur) - Photos of the former train station in 2017

Canadian Pacific Railway stations in Alberta
Rocky Mountaineer stations in Alberta
Disused railway stations in Canada
Buildings and structures in Calgary
Transport in Calgary